was a town located in Kaho District, Fukuoka Prefecture, Japan.

As of 2003, the town had an estimated population of 26,268 and a density of 1,041.14 persons per km2. The total area was 25.23 km2.

On March 26, 2006, Honami, along with the towns of Chikuho, Kaita and Shōnai (all from Kaho District), was merged into the expanded city of Iizuka.

References

External links
 Iizuka official website 

Dissolved municipalities of Fukuoka Prefecture
Populated places disestablished in 2006
2006 disestablishments in Japan